USS LST-986 was an  in the United States Navy. Like many of her class, she was not named and is properly referred to by her hull designation.

LST-986 was laid down on 15 January 1944 at the Boston Navy Yard; launched on 5 March 1944; and commissioned on 14 April 1944.

Service history
During World War II, LST-986 was assigned to the Asiatic-Pacific theater and participated in the following operations; capture and occupation of Guam (July and August 1944), Lingayen Gulf landings (January 1945), assault and occupation of Okinawa Gunto (April and May 1945).

Following the war, LST-986 performed occupation duty in the Far East until early March 1946. She returned to the United States and was decommissioned on 18 July 1946 and struck from the Navy List on 28 August that same year. On 4 November 1948, the ship was sold to the Moore Dry Dock Company, Oakland, California, for scrapping.

LST-986 earned three battle stars for World War II service.

References

 

LST-542-class tank landing ships
World War II amphibious warfare vessels of the United States
Ships built in Boston
1944 ships